Shappa is a musical side-project from two Serbian most active musicians of "young generation," Wikluh Sky (Bad Copy) and Coyote (Eyesburn, Burnin' Soundz), with help of King Kyll from Paris. Their pilot album with same name was released in April, 2005. by Ammonite records from Belgrade and it got positive critical notices from the media and audience. The trio had many concerts, but lately they are pausing and each member of Shappa is working on its own projects.

Their music is mix of roots reggae, dancehall, nightcore, dub and hip hop.

Track listing
 "Downlow"
 "Against the law"
 "I live with Jah"
 "Look me in the eyes"
 "Music warriors"
 "Dub another way"
 "Celebration"
 "Cross the Earth"
 "Information overload"
 "Hopefully forever"
 "What dem do"
 "World's on fire!"
 "All dem lies"
 "Search within"
 "Pow the pop"
 "Flexin' n' Flashin'"
 "Swag City"

References

Reggae albums by Serbian artists
2005 albums